Willy Robinson (born February 10, 1956) is an American football coach. He served as defensive coordinator under head coach Bobby Petrino at the University of Arkansas until he resigned December 6, 2011. Robinson spent twelve years as an NFL assistant, including one season as defensive coordinator of the San Francisco 49ers.

 1978 Fresno State University (Graduate Assistant)
 1979 San Jose State University (OLB)
 1980–1986 Fresno State University (DB)
 1987–1989 Fresno State University (OLB, co-DC in 1988)
 1990–1991 Fresno State University (DB/ST)
 1992–1993 Fresno State University (DC)
 1994 University of Miami (DB)
 1995–1998 Seattle Seahawks (DB)
 1999 Oregon State University (DB/DC)
 2000–2003 Pittsburgh Steelers (DB)
 2004 San Francisco 49ers (DC)
 2005 New Orleans Saints (DB)
 2006–2007 St. Louis Rams (DB)
 2008–2011 University of Arkansas (DB/DC)

References

1956 births
Living people
Arkansas Razorbacks football coaches
Fresno State Bulldogs football coaches
Miami Hurricanes football coaches
National Football League defensive coordinators
Oregon State Beavers football coaches
Pittsburgh Steelers coaches
San Francisco 49ers coaches
San Jose State Spartans football coaches
Seattle Seahawks coaches
St. Louis Rams coaches
Sportspeople from Colorado